Pousa, son of Sólyom (died 31 March 1241) was a Hungarian nobleman, who served as voivode of Transylvania twice, in 1227 and 1235 to 1241.

Pousa served as ispán (comes) of Vas County in 1225. During the reign of Andrew II, he was a faithful supporter of crown prince Béla, who held the title of Duke of Transylvania after 1226, following the agreement between the king and his son after a series of conflicts for the throne. Sometime Duke Béla acted independently of his father, as it is demonstrated by his grant of tax exemption to Transylvanian knights in 1231 and by his donation of lands situated in Wallachia in 1233. Pousa served as master of the treasury (camerarius) for Béla in 1225.

He was appointed voivode of Transylvania in 1227. According to László Markó, he held the office between 1226 and 1229, however existing charters only prove the term of voivodeship in 1227. He served as master of the horse for duke Béla between 1229 and 1233.

When Béla ascended the throne in 1235, Pousa was appointed voivode of Transylvania for the second time. In 1241, Transylvania suffered during the Mongol invasion of Europe. Güyük Khan invaded the province from the Oituz Pass in March. Voivode Pousa fought them with his royal army near Burzenland, where he fell in battle on 31 March 1241. The Mongols continued their campaign toward the interior of the Kingdom of Hungary.

References

Sources
 Curta, Florin (2006). Southeastern Europe in the Middle Ages, 500-1250. Cambridge University Press. .
 Engel, Pál (2001). The Realm of St Stephen: A History of Medieval Hungary, 895-1526. I.B. Tauris Publishers. .
 Kristó, Gyula (2003). Early Transylvania (895–1324). Lucidus Kiadó. .
  Markó, László (2006). A magyar állam főméltóságai Szent Istvántól napjainkig – Életrajzi Lexikon ("The High Officers of the Hungarian State from Saint Stephen to the Present Days – A Biographical Encyclopedia") (2nd edition); Helikon Kiadó Kft., Budapest; .
  Zsoldos, Attila (2011). Magyarország világi archontológiája, 1000–1301 ("Secular Archontology of Hungary, 1000–1301"). História, MTA Történettudományi Intézete. Budapest. 

1241 deaths
Voivodes of Transylvania
Hungarian military personnel killed in the Mongol invasion of Europe
Year of birth unknown
13th-century Hungarian people